Monopoly is a  video game based on the board game Monopoly, released on Game Boy, Genesis, NES, and SNES. Developed by Sculptured Software and published by Parker Brothers (the Game Boy version was published by Majesco Sales), this title was one of many inspired by the property.

It is not to be confused with the 1993 Monopoly game, which was released in Japan only.

Gameplay

The game contains very similar gameplay to the board game it is based on, with various physical tasks being replaced by automation and digital representations. Players choose among the eight classic characters: hat, wheelbarrow, iron, horse, car, boot, thimble, and dog. The goal is to buy as much property as possible when a player is working around the board. With properties, one can build houses and hotels on them and charge opponents rent. The winner sends others into bankruptcy.

Critical reception

Earl Green of AllGame deemed it "one of the better translations" of the Monopoly board game, due to it "captur[ing] the visual essence" of its source material. Just Games Retro argued that the game solved various problems of the board game, including it being too long, too fiddly, requiring a certain number of human players, and requiring the entire game to be finished in one sitting, noting that the gameplay is streamlined due to the digitisation of many aspects like banking. Pocket Magazine deemed it faithful to the original, while praising its gameplay, graphics, and sound, though noted the shortness of rounds. Sega-16 noted that it has the fun of Monopoly without the tedium of setting up and packing away the pieces. GameCola liked the game, though wished it had slightly better AI that could accommodate more players, and allowed for more customisation of gameplay. IGN wrote it was a good game for solitaire play, but not for multi-human play.

Entertainment Weekly gave the game a C- and wrote that the computerized opponents took 10–15 seconds each to make their moves, and this made the game rather slow.

Notes

References

External links
 Monopoly at MobyGames
 Kultboy review
 Joystick review

1991 video games
Game Boy Color games
Game Boy games
Majesco Entertainment games
Monopoly video games
Nintendo Entertainment System games
Parker Brothers video games
Sega Genesis games
Super Nintendo Entertainment System games
Video games developed in the United States